UWE-1 (Universität Würzburg's Experimentalsatellit-1) was one of three CubeSats built by students of the University of Würzburg, launched on 27 October 2005 as part of the European Space Agency's SSETI Express mission from Plesetsk in Russia, orbiting Earth in a  circular orbit. The cube-shaped satellite weighs about 1 kg and has an edge length of 10 cm, which corresponds to the CubeSat standard.

Mission 
The primary mission of UWE-1 was to conduct telecommunication experiments. Among other things, it was about the data transmission on the Internet under space conditions: It was necessary to adapt the common Internet protocols to the difficult conditions in space environment on Earth, the transport of data on the Web works very reliable, but in space can increasingly delays and disruptions occur. Furthermore, UWE-1 also served as a test laboratory for highly efficient solar cells, whose performance and durability should be investigated.

Downlink/uplink frequency was 437.505 MHz, modulation was 9600 baud AFSK. The amateur radio sign of UWE-1 was DPØUWE.

End of mission 
The last contact with the satellite took place on 17 November 2005. An identical UWE test model was made available to the Deutsches Museum in Munich in 2012, where it is exhibited together with a test model of the successor UWE-2 in the space department. UWE-1 was followed by the later UWE-2 launched into space on 23 September 2009.

UWE-1 still circles around the Earth today but fell silent after conducting the Internet experiments in 2005. Due to the friction with the rest of the atmosphere, UWE-1 continues braking until it will burn up completely in about 30 years.

See also 

 List of CubeSats

References

External links 
 About SSETI Express
 The PICO-satellite UWE-1 and IP based telecommunication experiments

Satellites orbiting Earth
Spacecraft launched in 2005
CubeSats